Frank Vincent Booth (28 February 1916 – 28 July 1974) was an Australian rules footballer who played with Collingwood and Hawthorn in the Victorian Football League (VFL).

Notes

External links 

Frank Booth's profile at Collingwood Forever

1916 births
1974 deaths
Australian rules footballers from Victoria (Australia)
Collingwood Football Club players
Hawthorn Football Club players
Australian Army personnel of World War II
Australian Army soldiers